PREPARE is an acronym for the European Union's Platform for European Preparedness Against (Re-)emerging Epidemics. The coordinator is professor Herman Goossens of the University of Antwerp.

References

External links 
 
 

European Union and science and technology

International responses to the COVID-19 pandemic